The Charmer is a 2017 Danish drama film directed by Milad Alami.

Cast
Ardalan Esmaili as Esmail
 as Sara
Susan Taslimi as Leila
Lars Brygmann as Lars
Elmira Arikan as Woman in Iran
Hassan El Sayed as Amir
Stine Fischer Christensen as Johanne
 as Liv

References

External links 

2017 films
2017 drama films
Danish drama films
2010s Danish-language films